Atlético Petróleos de Luanda is an Angolan multisports club based in Luanda. The club's handball teams (men and women) compete at the local level, at the Luanda Provincial Handball Championship and at the Men's and Women's leagues as well as at continental level, at the annual Champions League, Cup Winner's Cup and Super Cup competitions. Undoubtedly, the women's handball team of Petro Atlético has been the most successful team in Africa for many years.

Petro Atlético Men's Handball

Honours: Men's Handball
National Championship :
Winner (2): 1985, 2014
 Runner Up (0) :
Angola Cup:
Winner 0: 
 Runner Up (1) : 2014
Angola Super Cup:
Winner (0): 
 Runner Up (0) :
CHAB Club Champions Cup:
Winner (0): 
 Runner Up (0) :

Squad (Men)

Manager history
  André Costa – 2018

Players

Petro Atlético Women's Handball
Petro de Luanda is the most successful women's handball club in Africa with a record total of 42 titles of which 19 in the champions cup, 16 in the super cup and 7 in the cup winner's cup.

Honours: Women's Handball

Angola National Championship :
Winner (21): 1989, 1990, 1991, 1992, 1993, 1994, 1995, 1996, 1998, 2000, 2001, 2002, 2003, 2004, 2005, 2006, 2007, 2008, 2009, 2010, 2012
 Runner Up (6) : 2011, 2013, 2014, 2015, 2016, 2017

Angola Cup :
Winner (10): 2006, 2007, 2008, 2010, 2011, 2012, 2013, 2014, 2016, 2017
 Runner Up (1) : 2015

Angola Super Cup :
Winner (9): 2008, 2009, 2010, 2011, 2012, 2013, 2014, 2015, 2017
 Runner Up (2) : 2016, 2019

African Champions League :
Winner (19): 1993, 1995, 1997, 1998, 1999, 2000, 2001, 2002, 2003, 2004, 2005, 2006, 2007, 2008, 2009, 2010, 2011, 2012, 2013
 Runner Up (6) :1991, 1992, 1994, 1996, 2014, 2015

CHAB Babacar Fall Super Cup :
Winner (18): 1994, 1996, 1998, 1999, 2000, 2001, 2002, 2003, 2005, 2006, 2007, 2008, 2009, 2010, 2011, 2012, 2013, 2014
 Runner Up (4) :1995, 1997, 2015, 2019

CHAB Cup Winner's Cup :
Winner (8): 2008, 2009, 2010, 2011, 2012, 2013, 2014, 2018
 Runner Up (1) : 2019

Squad (Women)

Players

2011–2017
 = African champions cup winner'''

Former notable players

Former Managers

See also
Petro Atlético Football
Petro Atlético Basketball
Petro Atlético Roller Hockey
Federação Angolana de Andebol

References

External links
 Official Website
 Facebook profile

Sports clubs in Luanda
Angolan handball clubs
Handball clubs established in 1980
1980 establishments in Angola